The NBC Comedy Hour was a comedy show that ran on NBC in the first half of 1956, intended to be a replacement for The Colgate Comedy Hour.

Leo Durocher hosted the show in January, and Gale Storm from February until April 8; from April 22 on, hosts were called in per episode.  Comic Jonathan Winters was a more frequent face than any of the hosts; he appeared in 17 of the 18 episodes.  Stan Freberg was also a guest 6 times. Topical  comedian Mort Sahl's network debut was on the Comedy Hour. A group of acting chimpanzees named The Marquis Chimps performed parodies of movies in 3 episodes.

The show was a critical and ratings failure: Variety stated "A more poorly conceived, routined and paced outing would be difficult to imagine."   It was cancelled in June, having already been pre-empted 4 times in 5 months.  It was succeeded by The Steve Allen Show, whose reputation became a marked contrast to that of The NBC Comedy Hour. The Paley Center for Media has several episodes of the series in their archives.

References

External links
 

1956 American television series debuts
1956 American television series endings
1950s American comedy television series
1950s American variety television series
NBC original programming